The European mining industry has a long tradition. Although the continent's mining earns for a small share of GDP, it provides a large and significant share of the world-wide production.

Before World War II, the economy of Europe remained largely on coal as its source as primary energy, with very little of the diversification into oil and gas that has already occurred on United States. The mining and quarrying industry which extracts these minerals is very important to industrial, social and technological process in the European Union. Industrial minerals such as barytes, kaolinite, or salt are extracted within the European Union to supply a wide range of industries.

Europe's mining industry had a long, profitable history, dating as far back as 8000 years ago in eastern Europe, and mining copper as far back as early in eastern Europe and Spain. In Ancient Rome, mining for gold and copper in Spain, Cyprus and eastern Europe and tin in Cornwall were important. Dating back to as far as the Neolithic, every kinds of mineral rocks were mined in all parts of Europe. Underground mining required significantly more energy than surface operations because of the need for ventilation, pumps and the longer haulage distances involved. Coal, which was a fuel source for the world's largest economies that lasted over a century is now decreasing drastically to renewables and due to this, the United Kingdom went 55 hours without coal in favor of clean powers like windmills. The UK was one of the earliest adopters of renewable energy and it has by far the most windmills installed than other countries in the world.

The continent itself is rich in natural resources, and minerals, which are mined for usage in every-day life such as construction materials for infrastructure, building, roads, production of steel, cars, computers, medicines and fertilisers. Of those, Sweden is one of the European Union's leading ore and metal-producing countries and the Swedish mining industry is in a period of strong growth. An expanding Swedish mining industry would also contribute to greater self-sufficiency in the European Union, which was a priority in the ''Raw Materials Initiative — meeting our critical need for growth and jobs in Europe'', presented by the European Commission in 2008 and 2010. By 2020, resource mines in the European Union can possibly become diversified.

Employment 
The European metals and minerals mining sector employs more than 200.000 people directly in the extraction and beneficiation processes and numerous jobs are depending on it, the turnover of Europe alone is €13 billion Euros. In addition, there are another 100.000 people working at subsidiaries across the world, depending on Europe based headquarters of mining companies.  In western Europe, about 182,000 jobs in coal-mining were lost between 1988 and 1993, a reduction in employment by 40%, whereas coal production fell by about 8%, reflecting significant gains in productivity.

In 2012, an estimated 7 million people were employed in the mining industry, most of them in coal and lignite mining.

Profits 
Domestic mine production of industrial metals (excluding coal) was valued approximately $11 billion in 2018 compared with $10 billion in 2007 and $9.2 billion in 2006; the real producer's price index for industrial minerals in Germany increased about 3% in 2008 compared with 4% in 2007.

Natural resources

Lignite 
Several European countries are investigating in lignite mineral industry, despite the fact that the industry faces declining profit margins in competition with low-carbon energy production. The global lignite production is approximately one billion metric tons in 2012, with major production coming from Europe, the continent accounts for roughly 40% in lithium reserves. The Kosovar lignite mines are operated at one of the most strategic lignite deposits in Europe, due to its geological conditions.

In terms of lignite production, Greece ranks seventh worldwide and third in EU after Germany, based on the total lignite reserves in the country and the planned future consumption rate, it is estimated that the reserves in the country could last for more than 45 years.  Poland is one of the largest lignite reserves in the European Union, with around 1.4 billion tons of lignite in the country, and an additional 22.1 billion tons in economic reserves.

Gold 
The northern part of Europe, in particular Sweden and Finland, has shown to be an area with an abundance and large potential for gold mining. According to the magazine Tekniikka ja Talous, Finland has overtaken Sweden to become one of the largest producer of gold in Europe, which is located in Kittilä and is owned by the Canadian company Agnico Eagle, will be expanded out and, as a result, its production will increase to 6,000 kilograms per year. In the 13th and 14th centuries, Bohemia was one of the main regions of gold production in Europe.

Coal 
The total production of coal in Europe is about 15.14 million tons, translating to 3.9% of the total coal produced in the world, coal is preferred as a source of energy, due to its low cost compared to petroleum and natural gases.

Iron ore 
Sweden accounts for 91% of the continent's ore, in 2014 Swedish ore production broke a new record for the fifth year in a row; the increase was 2% from the previous year, and production amounted to almost 89.1 million tons. Of all the global market mining of ore, eastern Europe was the smallest region accounting around just 1% of the market, the use of robots in the metal ore mining industry is improving the efficiency and productivity of mines and reduces operational costs. The EU metallic mining sector produces a wide range of ores yielding metal substances.

See also 
 Mining in the United Kingdom
 Euromines
 Mineral industry of Armenia

References 

Mining in Europe